Rock in Rio 1985 is the fifth live album by brazilian rock band Os Paralamas do Sucesso, released in 2007. Was recorded at the Rock in Rio, in Rio de Janeiro, Brazil on January 16, 1985. Rock in Rio, more than an album is also one of the biggest music festival in the world. So far, Rock in Rio have been in four countries: Brazil, Spain, Portugal and United States.

Track listing

Personnel
Herbert Vianna - vocals, guitar
Bi Ribeiro - bass guitar
João Barone - drums

References

Os Paralamas do Sucesso live albums
Live video albums
2007 live albums
2007 video albums
EMI Records live albums

Som Livre live albums